Ea Kar is a township and capital of Ea Kar District, Đắk Lắk Province, Vietnam.

References

Communes of Đắk Lắk province
Populated places in Đắk Lắk province
District capitals in Vietnam
Townships in Vietnam